Kempston Hardwick is a small village on the edge of the town of Kempston in Bedfordshire, England. Historically it was one of the hamlets or "ends" scattered across the parish of Kempston. It is served by Kempston Hardwick railway station on the Marston Vale Line, which was one of the least-used stations in the UK railway network.

For many years Kempston Hardwick was technically part of Kempston town. This is a consequence of the division of the old larger Kempston parish in 1896 into Kempston town and Kempston Rural. However, modern boundary changes have meant that Kempston Hardwick is now part of the rural parish of Stewartby (where the 2011 Census population was included).

Hardwick Preceptory 
Hardwick Preceptory was a priory of the Knights Hospitaller from 1279 to 1489. The first mention of this property occurs in 1279. In 1287, and 1330, the Prior claimed to hold a view of frankpledge from four tenants in Kempston. In 1338, this estate comprised a messuage with a garden worth 4s. per annum, a dovehouse valued at 3s. 4d., a water-mill 26s. 8d., 370 acres of land worth £6 3s. 4d., 32 acres meadow worth 44s., 8 acres of pasture worth 8s., and pasture for 200 oxen worth 20s. After the Dissolution, the property, called the manor of Hardwick, was bestowed upon Sir Richard Longe in 1540.

See also 
 Kempston Hardwick railway station
 Kempston and Elstow Halt railway station
 List of monastic houses in Bedfordshire

References

External links 

 BBC News article about Kempston Hardwick
 Guardian article about Kempston Hardwick
 Kempston Hardwick pages at the Bedfordshire and Luton Archives and Records Service

Villages in Bedfordshire
Borough of Bedford
Kempston